The Young Socialists was the name of the anarchist and socialist organization that can be said to be responsible for the break, which took place in 1908, between Swedish anarchism and social democracy. It was, among other things, these Young Socialists who took care of the magazine Brand. The Young Socialists were, among other things, behind the formation of the Central Organisation of the Workers of Sweden (SAC) and the Young Socialist Party (UP). The organization existed until the end of the 1960s, then under the name of the Anarchist Federation.

History
The Swedish Social Democratic Party (SAP) was founded in 1889, and in 1897 its youth union, the Swedish Socialist Youth Union (SSU), was formed, which at that time called itself the Young Socialists. The first congress in 1899 was attended by 15 delegates from 8 clubs in the cities of Stockholm, Gothenburg, Eskilstuna, Västerås, Malmö and Gävle.

In contrast to the mother party, the Young Socialists moved quickly in a revolutionary direction. There was still no consensus within the Social Democrats as to whether to move in a reformist or revolutionary direction. Early on, the party leadership began to isolate the youth organization. A new organization was formed, the Social Democratic Youth League (SU) by the Malmö Club, (which was the organization's largest club) and two adjoining clubs in Sofielund and Svedala at a conference in 1903 adopted the party's program in its entirety and a strong anti-militarist stance. In 1905, the SU was adopted as the party's new youth wing, and after that the Young Socialists were isolated. Two leading figures in the organization, Carl G. Schröder and Hinke Bergegren, were excluded in 1908 and the divorce became inevitable thereafter. The whole organization followed and at an extraordinary congress on 23-25 August it was decided to form a new party, the Young Socialist Party (UP).

The Young Socialists soon became a large popular movement with 378 local branches across the country. The Young Socialists helped to spread the socialist ideas through, among others, the newspapers Brand and Lysekils-Kuriren. The magazine Brand presented various socialist ideologies, such as syndicalism, anarchism, Marxism and similar schools of thought. However, it is difficult to determine whether they would have advocated any of these socialist orientations. The Young Socialists were also not stuck in any direct ideology, even though their anarchist tendencies were strong.

There is a general description of events that "the Young Socialists started the SAC". The statement is not directly incorrect, but the process is not that simple either. In the plans for the formation of the SAC, many within the Young Socialists were hesitant. Among other things, they did not want to give rise to a division of the Swedish trade union movement, and many of the Young Socialists were active in Swedish Trade Union Confederation at the time. The organization was thus divided on the issue of SAC's formation. With the failed Great Strike of 1909, it was finally decided to form a new union. The Skåne department with the so-called Lund Committee, which included the young socialist Gustav Sjöström, became a driving force in the issue and in 1910 the Central Organisation of the Workers of Sweden (SAC) was formed.

At the congress in 1923, it was decided to return to the previous organization's designation and the association's name was established to the Swedish Young Socialist League (SUF). The Congress of 1934 again decided on a name change, this time to the Anarchist Propaganda Association (AP). In 1965, the organization changed its name again, now to the Anarchist Federation (AF). In the late 1960s, the organization was finally disbanded.

Notable members
John Andersson
Hinke Bergegren
Ragnar Casparsson
Maj Hirdman
Hilma Hofstedt
Axel Holmström
Albert Jensen
Leon Larsson
Anton Nilson
Carl G. Schröder
Gustav Sjöström

See also
Amalthea bombing

References

Bibliography
 

1908 establishments in Sweden
1968 disestablishments in Sweden
Anarchist organizations in Sweden
Anarchist political parties
Defunct socialist parties in Sweden
Libertarian socialist parties
Political parties established in 1908
Political parties disestablished in 1968
Swedish Social Democratic Party
Youth wings of political parties in Sweden
Syndicalist political parties